Michael Blodgett (September 26, 1939 – November 14, 2007) was an American actor, novelist, and screenwriter. Of his many film and television appearances he is best known for his performance as gigolo Lance Rocke in Russ Meyer's 1970 cult classic Beyond the Valley of the Dolls. He retired from acting in the late 1970s and began a writing career.

Early life and career
Born in Minneapolis, Minnesota, Blodgett attended the University of Minnesota before moving to Los Angeles to act. Once in Los Angeles, he earned a degree in political science from Cal State Los Angeles and attended Loyola Law School for one year before turning his attention to acting. In the summer of 1967, Blodgett served as emcee of The Groovy Show, a beach-party dance show for teens on Los Angeles's KHJ-TV. In 1968, Blodgett moved to KTTV, where he hosted a 90-minute Saturday night talk show, The Michael Blodgett Show.

After his role in Beyond the Valley of the Dolls in 1970, Blodgett appeared in the Western There Was a Crooked Man..., opposite Kirk Douglas and Henry Fonda, and then The Velvet Vampire (1971). Throughout the 1970s, Blodgett appeared in films and guest starring roles in television series including Barnaby Jones and The Secrets of Isis. Having become dissatisfied with the type of roles he was being offered, Blodgett made his last film appearance in 1978's Disco Fever and then shifted his focus to writing novels and screenplays. He would make a cameo appearance in the 1988 adaptation of his novel Hero and the Terror, and he also contributed to interview segments in the documentary Above, Beneath and Beyond the Valley, which was featured on the 2006 DVD release of Beyond the Valley of the Dolls.

In 1982, Blodgett released his first novel, Captain Blood, followed by his second novel Hero and the Terror, that same year. His third novel, The White Raven, was released in 1986 and was later adapted into a 1998 film starring Ron Silver. With his writing partner Dennis Shryack, Blodgett penned the screenplays for Rent-A-Cop (1987) starring Burt Reynolds, Turner & Hooch (1989) starring Tom Hanks, and Run (1991) starring Patrick Dempsey.

Personal life and death
Blodgett was married four times and had three daughters. His daughter Lucette is married to actor Miles Fisher.

Blodgett died at his home in Los Angeles of an apparent heart attack.

Filmography

Novels
Captain Blood  (1982)
Hero and the Terror  (1982)
The White Raven (1986)

References

External links

1939 births
2007 deaths
20th-century American novelists
20th-century American male writers
20th-century American male actors
20th-century American screenwriters
American male film actors
American male novelists
American male screenwriters
American male television actors
Burials at Forest Lawn Memorial Park (Glendale)
California State University, Los Angeles alumni
Loyola Law School alumni
Male actors from Minneapolis
Novelists from Minnesota
Screenwriters from Minnesota
University of Minnesota alumni
Writers from Minneapolis